Zimnyatsky is a rural locality (a khutor) and the administrative center of Zimnyatskoye Rural Settlement, Serafimovichsky District, Volgograd Oblast, Russia. The population was 1,834 as of 2010. There are 25 streets.

Geography 
Zimnyatsky is located in steppe, 22 km northeast of Serafimovich (the district's administrative centre) by road. Grushin is the nearest rural locality.

References 

Rural localities in Serafimovichsky District